University of Iringa (formerly Tumaini University, Iringa University College) is now a full-fledged University. The University operates as a private university under the ownership of the Evangelical Lutheran Church of Tanzania.

References

External links

Colleges in Tanzania
St. Augustine University of Tanzania
Educational institutions established in 1998
Lutheran universities and colleges
1998 establishments in Tanzania